The C.H. Black Manufacturing Company built the Black phaetons, dos-à-dos and business waggons in 2½ to 8 HP models in Indianapolis, Indiana, from 1896–1900.  There is some evidence that they built a vehicle as early as 1891.  
In 1900, the company sold its patents for $20,000.

References 

1890s cars
Defunct motor vehicle manufacturers of the United States
Motor vehicle manufacturers based in Indiana
Defunct companies based in Indiana
Cars introduced in 1896